Garcinia paucinervis is a species of flowering plant in the family Clusiaceae. It is a tree found in China and Vietnam. It is threatened by habitat loss.

References

paucinervis
Trees of China
Flora of Guangxi
Flora of Yunnan
Trees of Vietnam
Endangered plants
Taxonomy articles created by Polbot